Carrigadrohid Lake is a lake on the River Lee in County Cork, Ireland. Standing upstream (i.e. west) of Carrigadrohid village, it is a reservoir created for the Carrigadrohid hydroelectric power station, built in the 1950s.

Geography

Carrigadrohid Lake is located in southern Ireland.

Wildlife

Carrigadrohid Lake is a noted fishery for bream, rudd, roach, northern pike and perch.

See also 
 List of loughs in Ireland

References 

Lakes of County Cork
River Lee